Petr Šmejc (born 7 March 1978) is a Czech skier. He competed in the Nordic combined events at the 1998 Winter Olympics and the 2002 Winter Olympics.

References

External links
 

1978 births
Living people
Czech male Nordic combined skiers
Olympic Nordic combined skiers of the Czech Republic
Nordic combined skiers at the 1998 Winter Olympics
Nordic combined skiers at the 2002 Winter Olympics
People from Jilemnice
Sportspeople from the Liberec Region